The 1970 Targa Florio was an endurance race that took place on 3 May 1970. It was held on a 44.6 mi (71.8 km) anti-clockwise circuit made up entirely of public roads on the mountainous Italian island of Sicily. It was the fifth round of the 1970 International Championship for Makes.

Pre-race
The Targa Florio was in 1970 the oldest motor race in the world, even older than the Isle of Man TT and the Indianapolis 500. First run in 1906, it was run on narrow public mountain roads that went up and down, and twisted and turned around the Sicilian countryside. The race was run on a number of variants over the years- from 1932 to 1936 and 1951 to 1977 it was run on the 45 mile Piccolo (Italian for small) course- by far the longest circuit on the 1970 World Sportscar Championship calendar. It was one of, if not the last of the genuine road races still run in the world. The previous courses were 67 and 92 miles long; and there were 680 mile Island tour versions run in the early 1910s and the late 1940s. The Piccolo course went through 4 to 5 towns in the island of Sicily. The circuit was extremely demanding and very difficult to learn- over the 45 mile course, there were between 800 and 900 corners- 16 to 20 corners for every mile, and the circuit had about 2,000 feet of elevation change- twice that of the Nurburgring. There was also a number of straights joined together by a number of fast corners at the top of the circuit that measured out to about 6 miles- but the circuit was so twisty and had so many corners, average speeds never went past even 80 mph (128 km/h)- which in racing terms is very slow. The circuit was also very dangerous- although the roads and streets were closed off to the public for the race (but not for practice and test sessions- this caused all sorts of problems) the circuit was identical to every day civilian use, so it had no safety features of any kind and a crash often meant tumbling down a mountain slope or when in a town, crashing into a stone building, trees, and even groups of spectators. Although the Targa was a race where over its history very few people died in relation to other races like the Mille Miglia and the Carrera Panamericana, it was still a risky affair. 

The Targa Florio, was unusual in that it was a time trial race against the clock as opposed to a race for physical position. Like most races that take place on extremely long courses such as the Isle of Man TT, the Mille Miglia and some other Italian public road races, each car was started one at a time on the road at timed intervals, much like how a rally-type race is started instead of the cars starting alongside each other, which is almost always the case in general circuit racing and on every other race on the sportscar championship calendar in 1970. So, for example, Car A would be started at 10 minutes before Car B. Once Car B starts and as more race distance would be covered, if Car B was then 9 minutes behind Car A on the road, then Car B would actually be 1 minute in front of Car A. So it was really a driving challenge to see what car could cover the 11-lap distance the quickest- this is almost identical to how a rally works; the Madonie Piccolo course used roads that would be suited for a rally. Most drivers only knew what their position was every 35–50 minutes, and that was when they reached the start-finish line in the town of Cerda; or in more organized team's cases, in another town or on some part of the isolated section of the track, where members of teams would wait for their team's car to come by and they would show pitboards showing their position and how much time their opponents are in front or behind them, which was sometimes out of date; communication in those days was very limited (compared to now).

For this event, Porsche introduced their new car, the light and nimble 908/03, which was better suited to the twisty and demanding circuit than the big and powerful 917 (although Vic Elford managed to post the fifth fastest overall time with a spare 917K on Friday practice, he was so physically exhausted after doing this he had to be removed from the car). Porsche motorsports chief Ferdinand Piëch (a grandson of founder Ferdinand Porsche) and his team brought 4 908/03's to the island; 3 were given to John Wyer and his factory-supported team and 1 was run as an official works car. The 908/03, unlike the 917K, was of exclusive use for the factory teams.

Race distance was lengthened to 11 laps from 10 in previous years, to comply with championship regulations and so the race would last at least six hours.

Pole position went to the Wyer 908/03 of Jo Siffert/Brian Redman, followed by the official works 908/03 of Vic Elford/Hans Herrmann, the sole works Ferrari 512S of Sicilian Nino Vaccarella/Ignazio Giunti, a works Alfa Romeo T33/3 of Piers Courage/Andrea De Adamich and then another Wyer 908/03 of Leo Kinnunen/Pedro Rodriguez .

The 908/03's had a 3-liter Flat-8 engine; so they were entered in the 3-liter prototype class; as opposed to the big-engined Flat-12 917's and V12 Ferrari 512's which were competing in the 5-liter sportscar class.

There were 12 different classes of racing- more than any other race on the calendar.

Race
The turnout for the race exceeded 400,000 people; the large amount of area the circuit covered helped to spread people out.

Rodriguez was ill on raceday, so his co-driver, ex-rally driver Kinnunen took over as #1 and, in the rally-type event, sprinted into the lead in front of the Siffert/Redman 908/03. Once the car was handed off to Rodriguez, he lost the lead to Vaccarella in the lone works Ferrari. While out on the course, Redman caught up to Vaccarella, and attempted to pass him. Vaccarella blocked Redman and in doing so, nearly ran him off the road. This happened multiple times, and knowing Vaccarella knew the course extremely well, Redman decided to stay behind the Sicilian, cleverly deciding to wait for the next pit stop, knowing that the Wyer team was better at pitstops than Ferrari. And sure enough, when he came in after his 3-lap stint on the 6th lap, he handed the car off to Siffert, and Siffert got past the Ferrari while it was still in the pits, and Siffert sprinted off and went into the lead on the 7th lap, going ahead of the Kinnunen/Rodriguez car while Rodriguez was driving; Kinnunen had retaken the lead from Giunti sometime earlier in the race. 

Once Kinnunen was back in, he set the fastest ever lap of the Circuito Piccolo delle Madonie circuit- 33 minutes, 36.0 seconds on the last lap; and he managed to finish second to the Siffert/Redman car. There was some consolation for the Italian fans- homeland hero Nino Vaccarella in the sole works Ferrari 512 finished 3rd, the works Alfa of Courage/De Adamich crashed on the 8th lap and Elford also crashed the official works 908/03 on the first lap.

This was the 10th time a Porsche had won the Targa outright, a Porsche's first victory was in 1956. A final victory would come in 1973, when a Porsche 911 won outright. Porsche, on a track generally suited to their general design philosophy, hold the record for most victories at the Targa, a race which dated back to 1906.

Official results

Did Not Finish

Statistics
Pole position: #12 John Wyer Automotive Engineering Porsche 908/03 (Jo Siffert/Brian Redman) - 34:10.0 (78.321 mph/126.087 km/h)
Fastest lap: #40 John Wyer Automotive Engineering Porsche 908/03 (Leo Kinnunen)- 33:36.0 (79.890 mph/128.571 km/h)
Distance covered by cars on leading lap: 789.8 km
Time taken for winning car to cover distance: 6 hours, 35 minutes and 30 seconds
Average Speed: 120.152 km/h (74.659 mph)
Weather conditions: Sunny, dry, clear skies

References

Targa Florio
Targa Florio
1970 in Italian motorsport